The Zaniskari or Zanskari is a breed of small mountain horse or pony from Ladakh, in northern India. It is named for the Zanskar valley or region in Kargil district. It is similar to the Spiti breed of Himachal Pradesh, but is better adapted to work at high altitude. Like the Spiti, it shows similarities to the Tibetan breeds of neighbouring Tibet. It is of medium size, and is often grey in colour. The breed is considered endangered, as there are only a few hundred alive today, and a conservation programme has been started at Padum, Zanskar, in the Kargil district of Ladakh.

History 

The breed was listed as "not at risk" by the FAO in 2007. However, it has been endangered by indiscriminate cross-breeding with other horses and it is thought that only a few hundred pure-bred animals now remain, mainly in the valleys of Ladakh, including the Zanskar Gorge from which the breed takes its name. The Animal Husbandry Department of Jammu and Kashmir operates a farm at Padum, Zanskar, for the breeding and conservation of the breed. The population has declined rapidly due to mechanisation and to increases in the number of roads in its native area. However, the population did not in 2006 show signs of any significant genetic bottleneck.

In 2022 the conservation status of the breed was listed in DAD-IS as "at risk/critical maintained", based on a reported population of  animals.

A genetic analysis of five Indian horse breeds in 2007 found the Zaniskari to be close to the Manipuri, Spiti and Bhutia breeds, and more distant from the Marwari. A study of all six Indian breeds in 2014 grouped the Zaniskari with the Bhutia, Manipuri and Spiti breeds, and found it to be most closely related to the Spiti.

Characteristics 

The Zaniskari is strong, compact and well built, and is particularly adapted to work in the hypoxic environment of Ladakh. The most usual coat colour is grey; bay, brown, black and chestnut also occur.

Use 

It is strong and sure-footed, and has good stamina. The Indian army in Ladakh uses it as a pack-beast. It is also used for riding and for polo.

References 

Horse breeds
Horse breeds originating in India
Fauna of Jammu and Kashmir